Love Me is the first studio album released by rapper/song writer J Peezy. The album was released in 2008 for APB Entertainment.

Track listing 

1. Love Me (Intro) - 0:14
 	
2. Ambitionz - 4:49 	

3. Old Spiritual - 3:25 
	
4. Ride or Die - 3:57 	

5. Na Na Na - 4:47 	

6. Like My Daddy - 3:19 
	
7. Pull the Trigger - 3:55 	

8. Go Head - 3:57 	

9. This Old School - 3:39 	

10. Trippin - 4:55 		

11. If I Don't Make It - 4:21 	

12. Fixin to Get It - 3:46 	

13. Patron - 3:50 	

14. Hustle - A Tribute to Hip Hop - 4:06 
	
15. Rox n Weed Freestyle - 4:16 	

16. Rapp Tight - 3:52 	

17. Stunnaz - 3:42 	

18. Good Look - 4:04

2008 albums